Paul Evans may refer to:

Sportspeople
Paul Evans (Australian footballer) (born 1978), Port Adelaide AFL footballer
Paul Evans (basketball) (born 1945), American college basketball coach
Paul Evans (football manager), English football assistant manager and coach and ex goalkeeper
Paul Evans (footballer, born 1964), English footballer
Paul Evans (soccer, born 1973), South African football player
Paul Evans (footballer, born 1974), Welsh football player
Paul Evans (ice hockey, born 1954), Canadian ice hockey player who played for the Philadelphia Flyers
Paul Evans (ice hockey, born 1955), Canadian ice hockey player who played for the Toronto Maple Leafs
Paul Evans (runner) (born 1961), British runner

Politicians
Paul Evans (Oregon politician), American politician who served in the Oregon House of Representatives
Paul Evans (Illinois politician), American politician, member of the Illinois House of Representatives
Paul Evans Aidoo (born 1958), Ghanaian teacher and politician

Other people
Doc Evans (Paul Wesley Evans, 1907–1977), American jazz musician
Paul Evans (musician) (born 1938), American rock and roll singer/songwriter
Paul Evans (poet) (born 1945), British poet
Paul Evans (RAF officer) (born 1954), British military officer and medical doctor
Paul F. Evans, American law enforcement officer
Paul R. Evans (1931–1987), American furniture designer
Paul A. L. Evans, British professor of organisational behaviour
Paul Evans,  American pastor and radio host of Haven of Rest

Other uses
Paul Evans (brand), a New York City-based menswear brand

See also
Evans Paul (born 1955), Haitian politician